The 2003 Kano State gubernatorial election occurred on April 19, 2003. ANPP candidate Ibrahim Shekarau won the election, defeating PDP Rabiu Kwankwaso and 5 other candidates.

Results
Ibrahim Shekarau from the ANPP won the election. 7 candidates contested in the election.

The total number of registered voters in the state was 4,000,430, total votes cast was 2,313,527, valid votes was 2,197,405 and rejected votes was 116,122.

Ibrahim Shekarau, (ANPP)- 1,082,457
Rabiu Kwankwaso, PDP- 888,494
Kabir Atiku, APGA- 10,271
Amin Ibrahim Ali, PRP, 72,262
Umar Danhassan, PSP- 187,084
Mohammed Mukhtar, UNPP- 2,897

References 

Kano State gubernatorial elections
Kano State gubernatorial election
Kano State gubernatorial election